Coronation Street is a British soap opera first broadcast on 9 December 1960. The show has earned various awards and nominations over the years for its cast performances and storylines.

All About Soap Awards
The All About Soap Awards (formerly The All About Soap Bubble Awards) are presented by All About Soap magazine and voted for by the public. They started in 2002.

British Academy Television Awards
The British Academy Television Awards were launched in 1954 and are presented during an annual award show hosted by the British Academy of Film and Television Arts.

The British Soap Awards
The British Soap Awards begun in 1999. Since beginning in 1999, Coronation Street has won 111 awards, the most out of all soaps.

Inside Soap Awards
The Inside Soap Awards are voted for by readers of Inside Soap magazine. The awards have been running since 1996.

National Television Awards

Royal Television Society Awards
The Royal Television Society Awards ceremony takes place every March in central London.

Royal Television Society Craft & Design Awards
The Royal Television Society Craft & Design Awards are presented to recognize technical achievements in British television. The live episode received three nominations in 2011.

Television and Radio Industries Club Awards

TV Choice Awards
The TV Choice Awards, awarded by TV Choice magazine, began in 1997 as the TV Quick Awards. Between 2005 and 2009 they were known as the TV Quick and TV Choice Awards. They are voted for by readers of the magazine.

TVTimes Awards
The TVTimes Awards began in 1969 and are awarded by TVTimes magazine.

Other awards

References

External links
 Awards and nominations for Coronation Street at the IMDb

Awards and nominations
Lists of awards by television series
Awards and nominations received by Coronation Street